Moca fungosa is a moth in the family Immidae. It was described by Edward Meyrick in 1914. It is found in Taiwan.

References

Moths described in 1914
Immidae
Taxa named by Edward Meyrick
Moths of Taiwan